Longburn (or Karere) is a rural settlement just outside Palmerston North in the Manawatū-Whanganui area of New Zealand. Made up of large dairy processing plants Longburn is often mistaken to be a small township and not seen as a large satellite town of Palmerston North. The township is home to both Longburn School and Longburn Adventist College.

The population was 354 in 2018.

History

Some of the region's earliest settlers settled in the Longburn area, including former Prime Minister of Denmark Bishop Ditlev Monrad and his family.

Dairy
A butter factory was opened in 1884, butter and cheese were exported in kegs to Britain. 

An entirely new plant was opened at Longburn in 1966. Today Fonterra's Longburn milk processing plant in conjunction with its sister plant in Pahiatua collects milk daily from Lake Tutira in northern Hawke's Bay down to Whitemans Valley near Wellington.

In the peak milk season milk goes to casein production. There is a two-month winter shut-down each year. Raw milk is also processed at Longburn into concentrated milk and sent by rail to Fonterra Hawera where it becomes whole milk powder, cheeses and associated products.

Fonterra Longburn has just over 90 staff in 2021 of which more than 70 are tanker drivers.

Fonterra from Longburn and its other plants in New Zealand is responsible for approximately 30% of the world's dairy exports

Freezing works

Longburn Freezing Company Limited began their substantial operation in November 1889 on a 26 acres site beside the railway line. It soon experienced severe financial difficulties and, the undercapitalised business having borrowed large sums from them, the National Mortgage and Agency Company of New Zealand took control of the business during 1896. It was sold by NMA in 1940 to Manchester's Co-operative Wholesale Society, and closed in October 1987 under the management of Waitaki International.

Railway terminus
The Longburn Railway Station was the northern terminus of New Zealand's most prominent and successful private railway, the Wellington and Manawatu Railway Company.  The line between Longburn and Wellington was completed in 1886 and at Longburn, passengers and goods transferred between the Wellington and Manawatu Railway and the New Zealand Railways Department network.

On 8 December 1908, the Wellington and Manawatu was absorbed into the New Zealand Railways, and Longburn lost its significant interchange status.  However, the Foxton Branch was retained until it closed in 1959. The branch line resulted in the official name of the station changing from Long Burn to Longburn Junction. The name was adopted by the Junction Hotel opposite the station. The line through Longburn is now part of the North Island Main Trunk railway.

Growth
In an attempt to attract growth to the Manawatu region, the Manawatu District Council agreed to cede part of its territory to Palmerston North City. However, Longburn was a part of this only to the eastern side of the North Island Main Trunk Railway, effectively cutting the settlement in half.

Demographics

The population of Longburn was 354 in the 2018 New Zealand census, unchanged since the 2013 census, and an increase of 48 (15.7%) since the 2006 census. There were 180 males and 174 females, giving a sex ratio of 1.03 males per female. Ethnicities were 294 people  (83.1%) European/Pākehā, 120 (33.9%) Māori, 12 (3.4%) Pacific peoples, and 15 (4.2%) Asian (totals add to more than 100% since people could identify with multiple ethnicities). Of the total population, 93 people  (26.3%) were under 15 years old, 84 (23.7%) were 15–29, 150 (42.4%) were 30–64, and 27 (7.6%) were over 65.

Education

Longburn Adventist College is also located in Longburn.

References

OurRegion Manawatu

Populated places in Manawatū-Whanganui
Suburbs of Palmerston North